Hesseplaats is a station on Line B of the Rotterdam Metro and is situated in the Ommoord district of Rotterdam.

Rotterdam Metro stations
Railway stations opened in 1984
1984 establishments in the Netherlands
Railway stations in the Netherlands opened in the 20th century